Poniatów may refer to the following places in Poland:
Poniatów, Lower Silesian Voivodeship (south-west Poland)
Poniatów, Piotrków County in Łódź Voivodeship (central Poland)
Poniatów, Sieradz County in Łódź Voivodeship (central Poland)